Lepidodactylus pollostos is a species of gecko. It is endemic to Indonesia.

References

Lepidodactylus
Reptiles described in 2020
Endemic fauna of Indonesia
Reptiles of Indonesia
Taxa named by Edward Frederick Kraus
Taxa named by Paul M. Oliver